Naked is a 1993 British black comedy drama film written and directed by Mike Leigh and starring David Thewlis as Johnny, a loquacious intellectual and conspiracy theorist. The film won several awards, including best director and best actor at Cannes. Naked marked a new career high for Leigh as a director and made the then-unknown Thewlis an internationally recognised star.

Plot
In a Manchester alley, Johnny Fletcher rapes a woman. When her family arrive and chase him away, he steals a car and flees to Dalston, a "scrawny, unpretentious area" in east London. He seeks refuge at the home of Louise, a former girlfriend from Manchester, who is not happy to see him. Louise works as a file clerk and lives with two flatmates, the unemployed Sophie, whom she calls her "hippy-dippy friend", and the primary tenant Sandra, a nurse who is away in Zimbabwe.

Johnny seduces Sophie while treating Louise coldly, but soon tires of her. He leaves and walks around central London, expounding his world view at length to anyone who will listen. Among the people he meets are Archie, a young Scottish man looking for his girlfriend Maggie on Brewer Street, and Brian, a security guard who looks after an empty office building at night, which Johnny calls "the most tedious job in England", while planning to move to a seaside cottage in the future.

After pursuing a drunk woman and rejecting her when he notices a skull and crossbones tattoo on her shoulder, Johnny follows a young cafe worker home but is thrown out when she starts crying. He hitches a ride with a man hanging posters around town until the man, exasperated by Johnny's nonstop haranguing, throws him down in the street and kicks him before driving off with Johnny's duffel bag containing his clothes and books. Johnny wanders the streets and is severely beaten by a wandering gang of thugs.

He returns to Louise's residence to find that their landlord Jeremy (aka Sebastian), a psychotic and amoral yuppie and rapist, has let himself into the apartment and raped Sophie. Sophie is desperate to get Jeremy out of the house, but she and Louise fear the police will not help. They try to keep the injured Johnny quiet, but he has a fit that awakens the sleeping Jeremy.

Sandra returns early from her trip. Though horrified by the state of the apartment, she tends to Johnny's injuries. Louise drives Jeremy from the house by feigning interest in him, then pulling a knife on him. He departs, leaving behind several hundred pounds. Feeling desolate and rejected, Sophie flees the house with her few possessions. Louise and Johnny seemingly reconcile and discuss returning to Manchester together, but once she leaves for work, Johnny steals the money and hobbles out into the streets.

Cast

 David Thewlis as Johnny Fletcher
 Lesley Sharp as Louise Clancy
 Katrin Cartlidge as Sophie
 Greg Cruttwell as Jeremy G. Smart / Sebastian Hawk
 Claire Skinner as Sandra the Nurse
 Peter Wight as Brian, the security guard
 Ewen Bremner as Archie the Scotsman with a tic
 Susan Vidler as Maggie
 Gina McKee as The Cafe Girl
 Elizabeth Berrington as Giselle
 Darren Tunstall as Poster Man

Production

Background and development
Leigh first had the idea for the story while a student in Manchester in the early 1960s: "We had a very enlightened teacher who endlessly reminded us that the next total eclipse would be in August 1999. Later I started thinking about the millennium and the end of the world. In 1992 the millennium was impending, so I brought that idea to the film."

In 1965, Leigh teamed up with David Halliwell, hired the Unity Theatre for a fortnight, and directed the first production of Halliwell's Little Malcolm and his Struggle Against the Eunuchs. According to theater critic Michael Coveney, "Malcolm Scrawdyke is clearly a precursor of Johnny in Naked. Scrawdyke was a loutish art student and absurd ideologue from Huddersfield who had trouble with girls and a hatred for his teachers...the play shared a deeply felt schoolboy coarseness with Alfred Jarry's Ubu Roi, a piece originally written as a vicious attack on a loathed mathematics master."

Leigh's method, as in all his character dramas, consisted of elaborate improvisational rehearsals with the cast to develop the characters' background stories and traits. The actors interacted with the outside world and each other while in character until Leigh told them to come out of character and be themselves. The dialogue produced from these interactions was then edited, or "distilled", to form the script, based on a minimal plot outline by Leigh. The cast was not allowed to discuss their characters with one another outside of rehearsals, as Leigh, for realism, would rather they meet and interact as they would in real life. Thewlis's background reading for the part of Johnny included Voltaire's Candide, the teachings of Buddha and James Gleick's Chaos, as well as the Bible and the Qur'an.

Principal photography
After weeks of improvisation, filming took place in London from 9 September to 16 December 1992. Sandra's Neo-Gothic home was an actual interior/exterior location that Leigh featured heavily, particularly in the last shot of the film, as its corner location allowed for wide street views.

The scenes between Johnny and Brian the security guard came from an eight-hour improvisation. The uncut shot of Johnny and Brian in silhouette, where Johnny expounds on his convoluted apocalyptic conspiracy theory, had 26 takes, but Leigh ended up using one of the earliest. The film's dialogue has a loose, improvisational quality but, according to Thewlis, the only improvisation filmed on location was the scene of Johnny meeting and antagonising the poster man.

The song sung by Johnny and Louise near the film's end, "Take me back to Manchester when it's raining", was one Leigh used to sing with his friends in Habonim ("the Builders"), the international socialist Jewish youth movement he joined as a schoolboy. After the film was released, Leigh heard from a retired schoolmaster at Stand Grammar in Whitefield, Greater Manchester, who had written the song for a school revue in 1950.

Themes
The film is dark, monochromatic and claustrophobic, with subtle visual references to film noir and Alfred Hitchcock. Many shots are in stairwells and in borrowed flats whose tenants are hostile toward or unaware of the decor, making them seem disconnected from cultural touchstones and their place in their homes. Alienation, sexual violence and misogyny, addiction and depression are touched upon as Johnny meets various rootless individuals who work in dead-end jobs or are unemployed.

Intelligent, educated and eloquent, Johnny is also deeply embittered and egotistical. He tends to dominate conversations with his aggressive intellectualism and theories about modern culture. His tactics are based on a particular form of intellectual bullying, directed at strangers and intimate partners alike, and summed up in domineering, scholastic barrages drawn from eclectic sources. His overall behaviour is reckless, self-destructive, and at times borderline sadistic, and shows a penchant for aggressive sexual domination at least twice in the film.

Biographer Sheridan Morley described Johnny as "Alfie in the grips of Thatcherite depression"—thus, according to critic Michael Coveney, "cross fertilising Bill Naughton's chirpy cockney Lothario, immortalised by Michael Caine, with the dark sinister disaffection of the new underclass—a neat way of indicating that the Swinging Sixties had degenerated into the nauseated Nineties." Coveney said that Leigh had captured something of the anxiety, rootless cynicism, and big-city disaffection of the time.

Ben Myers, in a Guardian article calling Naked Mike Leigh's "finest work" and "the best British film in recent history", elaborated on the many theories filmgoers have had on who Johnny might represent: "a modern, albeit highly flawed, Jesus attempting to change people's lives. Or perhaps he's the devil himself. Others have suggested it is a post-AIDS morality movie, or a classic urban existentialist tale."

Critics have suggested comparisons with William Shakespeare's Hamlet and Jean Renoir's Boudu Saved from Drowning (one of Leigh's favourite films). Hamlet talks "incessantly to the audience [...] assuming a dominance over other characters through expressions of mania, and rapid, witty speech. Thewlis, [...] wrapped like Hamlet in a black and inky coat, [is similarly] socially untethered but burdened with useless knowledge and a vicious, bullying line in repartee." Of the precedent of "idiosyncratic, character-driven film-making" in Boudu, Coveney said: "Both Naked and Boudu explore the tension between the domesticated and the anarchic (this is a central theme, probably the theme running through Leigh's work), and focus this tension in the tragicomedy of a central character."

Reception
The film generated mostly positive reviews from critics. Review aggregator Rotten Tomatoes gives the film an 88% "fresh" rating based on reviews from 60 critics, with an average score of 8.30/10 and the consensus: "Naked lives up to its title with a thoroughly committed performance from David Thewlis that's backed up with some of Mike Leigh's most powerful direction." Metacritic, another review aggregator, assigned the film a weighted average score of 84 (out of 100) based on 20 reviews from mainstream critics, considered to be "universal acclaim."

Derek Malcolm of The Guardian noted that the film "is certainly Leigh's most striking piece of cinema to date" and that "it tries to articulate what is wrong with the society that Mrs Thatcher claims does not exist." Of Johnny, he writes: "He likes no one, least of all himself, and he dislikes women even more than men, relapsing into sexual violence as his misogyny takes hold. He is perhaps redeemable, but only just. And not by any woman in our immediate view." He praised the directing and performances, singling out Thewlis, writing that he "plays [Johnny] with a baleful brilliance that is certain to make this underrated, but consistently striking, actor into a star name ... [Johnny] is, at his worst, a cold, desperate fish. His redeeming feature is that he still cares."

Roger Ebert of the Chicago Sun-Times gave the film four out of four stars and analysed the message behind the title, saying it "describes characters who exist in the world without the usual layers of protection. They are clothed, but not warmly or cheerfully. But they are naked of families, relationships, homes, values and, in most cases, jobs. They exist in modern Britain with few possessions except their words." He praised the directing, writing: "[Leigh's] method has created in Naked a group of characters who could not possibly have emerged from a conventional screenplay; this is the kind of film that is beyond imagining, and only observation could have created it." He concluded: "This is a painful movie to watch. But it is also exhilarating, as all good movies are, because we are watching the director and actors venturing beyond any conventional idea of what a modern movie can be about. Here there is no plot, no characters to identify with, no hope. But there is care: The filmmakers care enough about these people to observe them very closely, to note how they look and sound and what they feel."

Julie Burchill attacked the film in The Sunday Times, saying that Leigh's characters talked like lobotomised Muppets: "sub-wittily, the way Diane Arbus's subjects look." And Suzanne Moore in The Guardian criticised the lethargic females whose lives Johnny routinely ruins: "What sort of realism is this? To show a misogynist and surround him with such walking doormats has the effect, intentional or not, of justifying this behaviour." Lesley Sharp responded: "There are a lot of people who don't go to art house cinemas who do have deeply troubled lives and are at risk ... We do actually live in a misogynistic, violent society and there are a lot of women in abusive relationships who find it very difficult to get out of them. And a lot of men, too." Coveney wrote in the film's defence: "Is there no room for irony, for the idea that in depicting horror in the sex war an artist is exposing them, not endorsing them? And who says that Sophie is an unwilling doormat or that Louise is a doormat at all? It is clear that the latter is taking serious stock of her relationship with Johnny. She exhibits both patience and tenderness in her dealings with him, whereas she finally pulls a knife on Jeremy."

Box office
The film opened in the UK on 22 screens on 5 November 1993 and grossed £52,279 for the weekend for 16th position at the UK box office.

Year-end lists 
 Top 7 (not ranked) – Duane Dudek, Milwaukee Sentinel
 Best "sleepers" (not ranked) – Dennis King, Tulsa World

Awards and nominations
 Cinéfest: Best International Film (1993) (won)
 Cannes Film Festival (1993): Best Director (won)
 Cannes Film Festival (1993): Palme d'Or (nominated)
 Cannes Film Festival: Best Actor – David Thewlis (1993) (won)
 New York Film Critics Circle Awards: Best Actor – David Thewlis (1993)
 Toronto International Film Festival: Metro Media Award (1993) (won)
 Belgian Syndicate of Cinema Critics: Grand Prix (1994) (nominated)
 Evening Standard British Film Awards: Best Actor – David Thewlis (1994)
 London Critics Circle Film Awards ALFS Award: British Actor of the Year – David Thewlis (1994)
 National Society of Film Critics Awards: Best Actor – David Thewlis (1994)
 BAFTA Awards Alexander Korda Award for Best British Film (1994) (nominated)
 Independent Spirit Awards: Best Foreign Film (1994) (nominated)

References

External links

 Naked at the British Film Institute
 
 
 
 
 The Guardian interviews Mike Leigh and David Thewlis
 locations
British Film Institute Screen Online
Naked: Desperate Days an essay by Derek Malcolm at the Criterion Collection

1993 films
1990s black comedy films
1993 comedy-drama films
British black comedy films
Films about rape
Films directed by Mike Leigh
Films set in London
Films set in Manchester
Films shot in Greater Manchester
Films shot in London
British independent films
1993 independent films
1990s English-language films
1990s British films